Hedvig Apollonia Löfwenskiöld, as married Lillienanckar (1736–1789), was a Swedish writer, lady of letters and poet.

She was the daughter of the official and poet Henrik Anders Löfvenskiöld and the niece of the poet Charlotta Löfgren. The correspondence between her and her colleagues Charlotta Löfgren, Samuel Älf and Hedwig Walldorff is preserved. She was a member of the literary society Apollini Sacra, a daughter academy of the Utile Dulci. In one poem, she states that the intellectual inferiority of females was the consequence of the lack of education and knowledge and that given the same schooling, the intellect of the genders would be equal.

References 
 Ann Öhrberg (2001). Vittra fruntimmer. Författarroll och retorik hos frihetstidens kvinnliga författare. Stockholm: Gidlunds Förlag. 
 Sven G. Hansson (1991). Satir och kvinnokamp. I Hedvig Charlotta Nordenflychts diktning.. Carlsson Bokförlag. 

1736 births
1789 deaths
18th-century Swedish women writers
Swedish poets
Place of birth missing
Swedish women poets
18th-century Swedish poets
Age of Liberty people